Thomas Kemp (28 February 1779 – 2 March 1824) was a Baltimore shipbuilder, known for building some of the fastest and best known privateers of the War of 1812, such as , , Patapsco, Chasseur, and Lynx.

Early Career as a Shipbuilder 
Thomas Kemp moved to Baltimore in 1803 from near Saint Michaels, Maryland on the Eastern Shore of Maryland. He is thought to have learned at least some of his shipbuilding skills at the Dawson's wharf shipyard in St. Michaels. In 1804, he built a schooner with his brother Joseph. In the next few years his shipyard was mostly involved in making repairs to Baltimore vessels. He made some repairs for Isaac McKim on the schooner Maryland, the brig Samuel and the Chesapeake, for Henry Craig on the Vigilante and the schooner Eclipse and for John Conway on the schooner Nonsuch.

Building Baltimore Clippers 
On July 6, 1805, Kemp purchased additional property bounded by Fountain, Fleet, and Washington streets at Fell's Point, expanding his business and establishing his own shipyard.

It is important to noticed that some of the vessels built by Kemp were attributed to different shipbuilders, partially because Kemp did not put his name on those ships, as it was against Quaker principles.

Ships Built by Thomas Kemp's Shipyard

Thomas and Joseph (1804), a schooner Kemp built with his brother, Joseph
Lynx (1806), 99 tons, a Baltimore clipper schooner for Henry Craig
Maria (1806), a schooner for Henry Craig
Eidue (1806), 190 tons, a brig for Captain Christopher Deshon
Unnamed schooner (possibly Breezio) (1806), 114 1/3 tons, for Captain Christopher Deshon
Hawk (or Mohawk) (1807), 124 tons, a schooner for Henry Craig
Leo (1807), 244 1/4 tons, a brig for Henry Wilson.
a pilot boat (1807) for William Harrow
five ships (1807) for Isaac McKim, Henry Wilson, James Barry, John McKee, and Henry Craig
Rossie (1808), a schooner and a privateer of the War of 1812.
a schooner (1808), 146 1/2 tons, for John McFadon
two gunboats (1808) for John Strieker for the United States
Experiment (1808), 108 tons, a schooner for Captain Christopher Deshon
two schooner brigs (1808) for Henry Wilson and John McKee
Aut (1809), a schooner for Charles Kalkman
a pilot boat schooner (possibly Wasp) (1809) for James Taylor and Curtis
a schooner (possibly Hornet) (1809), 100 tons, for James Taylor and Curtis
 (1810), a schooner and a privateer of the War of 1812, commanded by Captain Thomas Boyle.
a schooner (1810), 189 91/95 tons, for Hollins & McBlair
a schooner (possibly Leopard) (1810), 79 50/95 tons, for P. A. Gestier
Milo (1810), 230 34/95 tons, a brig for James Williams
Wabash (1810), 262 1/2 tons, for Samuel Smith & Buchanan
a pilot boat (1810) for William Pitt
Extreme (1811), 122 1/3 tons, length 65' 6", a schooner for Captain Robert Hambleton
Marmion (1811), 244 tons, for Smith & Buchanan
a pilot boat (1811) for William Pitt
a small boat (1811) for Joseph Butler
Arrow (1811), 180 74/95 tons, a schooner for  Hollins & McBlair
Emperor of Russia (1810), 430 tons, for Charles F. Kalkman
Patapsco (1810s), 259 tons, a ten-gun schooner commissioned as a privateer on 4 June 1814 under command of Richard Moon.
Grecian (1812), 187 1/4 tons, for Isaac McKim
Chasseur (1812), a topsail schooner and a privateer of the War of 1812, commanded by Captain Thomas Boyle.
Lynx (1812), a six-gun schooner commissioned as a privateer under command of captain Elisha Taylor.
three barges (1814) for United States Navy
David Porter (1814), 18 1/2 tons, a sloop
Perry (1814), possibly was built by Kemp
a schooner (1814), 122 1/2 tons, for Fulford & Clopper
a schooner (1814), 124 63/95 tons, for Pearl Durkee
Seagull (1815), a sloop for Captain James Martin
a schooner (1818) for George Williams 
a schooner (1819) for Henry Payson & Co. 
K&R (1822), a schooner built by Kemp and Joseph Robson

After the War of 1812 
After the War of 1812 demand on shipbuilding declined and Kemp returned to the Eastern Shore to live at his farm, Wade's Point. He only built a few vessels after the war.

References 

1779 births
1824 deaths
Boat and ship designers
19th-century American people
American shipbuilders
American shipwrights
19th century in Baltimore
History of Baltimore